Khamphanh (born 15 June 1961) is a Laotian sports shooter. He competed in the mixed 25 metre rapid fire pistol event at the 1980 Summer Olympics.

References

1961 births
Living people
Laotian male sport shooters
Olympic shooters of Laos
Shooters at the 1980 Summer Olympics
Place of birth missing (living people)